Drosera prostratoscaposa is a perennial tuberous species in the genus Drosera that is endemic to Western Australia. It grows in a rosette about 8 cm in diameter. It is native to a small area in the Fitzgerald River National Park 40 km south-east of the South Coast Highway in between Albany and Esperance. It grows in fine black sandy soils. It is considered to be closely related to D. macrophylla and D. bulbosa, but differs from these by the presence of multiple jasmine-scented flowers on its scapes and petiolate leaves.

It was first discovered in 1989 by Phill Mann and then formally described by Allen Lowrie and Sherwin Carlquist in 1990.

See also 
List of Drosera species

References

External links 

Carnivorous plants of Australia
Caryophyllales of Australia
prostratoscaposa
Eudicots of Western Australia
Plants described in 1990